The 2002 Massachusetts gubernatorial election was held on November 5, 2002. Incumbent Republican acting governor Jane Swift chose not to seek a full term in office. Republican businessman Mitt Romney defeated Democratic Treasurer Shannon O'Brien.

Republican primary

Governor

Candidates 
 Mitt Romney, businessman and nominee for U.S. Senate in 1994

Withdrew
 Jane Swift, acting governor
In 2002, Republican lieutenant governor Jane Swift was expected to campaign for the governor's office, and she had said she would in October 2001. Swift had been serving as acting governor after Republican governor Paul Cellucci resigned upon being appointed U.S. Ambassador to Canada. However, Swift was viewed as an unpopular executive, and her administration was plagued by political missteps and personal and ethical controversies. Many Republicans viewed her as a liability and considered her unable to win a general election against a Democrat.

Prominent GOP activists campaigned to persuade businessman Mitt Romney, who had previously run for the U.S. Senate from the state, to run for governor. Romney was coming off a successful stint as head of the Salt Lake Organizing Committee for the Olympic and Paralympic Winter Games of 2002 and was also mentioned as a possible candidate for Governor of Utah. Romney had previously indicated in fall 2001 that he would not challenge a sitting Republican in running for the Massachusetts governorship, and thus was in a delicate position.  Massachusetts Republican State Committee chair Kerry Healey had flown to Utah to personally assess Romney's intentions.

On March 17, Romney flew to Massachusetts; a Boston Herald poll showed him defeating Swift by a 75 percent to 12 percent margin in a  Republican primary.  Two days later, Swift declared that she had decided not to seek her party's nomination, citing  family reasons and also saying "I believe that this is in the best interest of our state, as it will allow the Republican Party's best chances of holding the governor's office in November." Three hours later, Romney announced his candidacy.  Romney was subsequently unopposed in the Republican party primary.

Polling

Lieutenant governor

Candidates
 Kerry Healey, chair of the Massachusetts Republican Party
 Jim Rappaport, former chair of the Massachusetts Republican Party and nominee for U.S. Senate in 1990

Withdrew
 Donna Cuomo, former State Representative from North Andover
 Patrick Guerriero, deputy chief of staff to Jane Swift and former mayor of Melrose

Declined
 Frank Cousins, Essex County Sheriff
 Daniel Grabauskas,  Registrar of Motor Vehicles (ran for Treasurer and Receiver-General)
 Ralph C. Martin II, Suffolk County District Attorney
 Christy Mihos, member of the Massachusetts Turnpike Authority

Jim Rappaport, the Republican nominee for United States Senate in 1990 and a political adversary of Jane Swift, was the first Republican to declare his candidacy for lieutenant governor.

In February, Swift named Patrick Guerriero, her deputy chief of staff, as her running mate after multiple others, including Christy Mihos, declined. Guerriero was the nation's first openly gay candidate for lieutenant governor.

After Romney entered the race he selected Kerry Healey, former chairman of the Massachusetts Republican Party, to be his running mate. Shortly after Romney's endorsement of Healey, Guerriero dropped out of the race and gave his support to Healey. Rappaport remained in the race and lost to Healey in the Republican primary.

Results

Democratic primary

Governor

Candidates
 Thomas Birmingham, President of the Massachusetts Senate
 Shannon O'Brien, Treasurer and Receiver-General of Massachusetts
 Robert Reich, former United States Secretary of Labor
 Warren Tolman, former State Senator from Watertown and nominee for Lieutenant Governor in 1998

Withdrew
 Steve Grossman, former chair of the DNC and president of AIPAC

The leader in most of the polls conducted was O'Brien, who was a longtime insider with four generations of heritage in the Beacon Hill political establishment. However, she faced criticism for some of the losing investments she had made as state treasurer.

Reich's candidacy attracted considerable media attention, especially due to the 1997 publication of his memoir of working for the Clinton administration, Locked in the Cabinet. Reich had received criticism for embellishing events with invented dialogue, and the book had so angered Bill Clinton that he endorsed Grossman instead.

Of the Democrats running, only Tolman elected to accept Clean Elections funding.

Polling

Results
In the September 17, 2002, primary, O'Brien won with 33 percent of the vote; Reich came in second with 25 percent, followed by 24 percent for Birmingham and 18 percent for Tolman (Grossman had dropped out before then).

Lieutenant governor

Candidates
 Chris Gabrieli, businessman
 Lois Pines, former State Senator from Newton
 John P. Slattery, State Representative from Peabody

Eliminated at convention
 Sarah Cannon Holden

Withdrew
 Stephen Lynch, State Senator from South Boston (ran for 9th congressional district)
 Cheryl A. Jacques, State Senator from Needham (ran for 9th congressional district)

Gabrieli was the running mate of Shannon O'Brien while Slattery and Pines were not affiliated with any candidate.

Results

General election

Candidates 

 Carla Howell, Libertarian nominee for U.S. Senate candidate in 2000 (Libertarian)
 Running mate: Rich Aucoin, mechanical designer and candidate for Waltham Council in 2001
 Barbara C. Johnson (Independent)
 Running mate: Joe Schebel, self-employed carpenter
 Shannon O'Brien, Treasurer and Receiver-General of Massachusetts (Democratic)
 Running mate: Chris Gabrieli
 Mitt Romney, businessman and Republican nominee for U.S. Senate in 1994 (Republican)
 Running mate: Kerry Healey, chair of the Massachusetts Republican Party
 Jill Stein, internist at Simmons College Health Center (Green-Rainbow)
 Running mate: Tony Lorenzen, high school theology teacher

Question of Romney's residency
Before the primaries concluded, Democratic officials claimed that Romney was ineligible to run for governor, citing residency issues. The Massachusetts Constitution requires that a gubernatorial candidate be an "inhabitant" for seven consecutive years prior to a run for office.

Romney had attended business and law school at Harvard and spent his entire business career in Massachusetts until being hired to organize the Salt Lake Olympics in 1999. In 1999, Romney had listed himself as a part-time Massachusetts resident, Romney had claimed residency in Utah from 1999 to 2002, during his time as president of the Salt Lake Organizing Committee and received a $54,000 property tax break there. Romney now offered to pay back that exemption. Romney said that he had planned to return to Massachusetts all along.

On June 8, 2002, the Massachusetts Democratic Party filed a complaint with the Massachusetts State Ballot Law Commission, which tended to be lenient in its interpretations of the requirements for residency. At the time the commission was composed of three Republicans, one Democrat and one independent. On June 25, 2002, the commission unanimously ruled that Romney was eligible to run for office, saying that "[Romney] never severed his ties to Massachusetts [and] his testimony was credible in all respects." The ruling was not challenged in court, and Romney accused the Democrats of playing "ridiculous, dirty politics".

Campaign
Romney ran as a political outsider and as an agent of change, saying he would "clean up the mess on Beacon Hill."  He said he was "not a partisan Republican" but rather a "moderate" with "progressive" views Romney declared support for faith-based initiatives and campaigned as a pro-choice candidate who would protect a woman's right to an abortion. He rejected the endorsement of Massachusetts Citizens for Life, an anti-abortion organization.

O'Brien claimed Romney was "trying to mask a very conservative set of belief systems". While saying she would not criticize his membership in the LDS Church, she attacked his substantial donations to Brigham Young University, objecting to their bar on expressions of homosexuality. O'Brien came out in support of same-sex marriage.

Supporters of Romney hailed his business record, especially his success with the 2002 Olympics, as that of one who would be able to bring a new era of efficiency into Massachusetts politics. His campaign was the first to use microtargeting techniques, in which small groups of voters were reached with narrowly tailored messaging.

He proposed to reorganize the state government and stressed his ability to obtain federal funds for the state.  Romney said he would  cut $1 billion out of the $23 billion state budget by eliminating the usual suspects of waste, fraud, and mismanagement while still reducing taxes over a phased period. He also said he was generally against tax increases, but refused to rule out the possibility of a tax increase. He did attempt to paint O'Brien as a 'tax-and-spend liberal'.

O'Brien focused her attacks by portraying Romney as being out of place in Massachusetts. Romney had stumbled earlier in the year by not knowing that "MCAS" stood for the Massachusetts Comprehensive Assessment System of school exams. To soften Romney's image, a series of "work days" had been staged over the summer, in which he performed blue-collar jobs such as herding cows and baling hay, unloading a fishing boat, and hauling garbage. Television ads highlighting the effort, as well as one portraying his family in gushing terms and showing him shirtless, received a poor public response. O'Brien responded, "Massachusetts doesn't need a governor who thinks getting in touch with working people is a costume party."

By mid-October, Romney trailed O'Brien in most polls. He responded with negative ads that accused O'Brien of mismanaging pension funds. Specifically, one ad featured a basset hound sleeping as men removed bags of money from the Massachusetts treasury. Another associated her husband Emmet Hayes, a former lobbyist, with the Enron scandal.

O'Brien's campaign was hobbled by the short amount of time between the primary and the general election and by her having exhausted most of her funds by spending $4.5 million to win the nomination. Romney, able to focus on the general election in the absence of any primary contest, contributed over $6 million to his own campaign during the election, a state record at the time.  He raised nearly $10 million for his campaign overall.

Jill Stein campaigned against requiring that students pass the Massachusetts Comprehensive Assessment System tests to graduate high school and in support of clean air and bilingual education.

Debates
In the debates, O'Brien attacked Romney repeatedly. He referred to her style as "unbecoming", which engendered criticism that he was insensitive to women.

After being excluded from the first debate, Stein and Independent candidate Barbara Johnson sued the media organizers of the debate. Middlesex Superior Court Judge Linda Giles ruled against Stein and Johnson, stating that the state's campaign finance laws do not apply to the press organizing political debates and that the invitations to Shannon O'Brien and Mitt Romney did not constitute a campaign contribution.

Predictions

Polling 

 with Jane Swift

with Robert Reich

Results 

Romney and Healey were elected governor and lieutenant governor with 49.2 percent of the vote over O'Brien and Gabrieli, who received 44.4 percent. Ten years later, Romney and Stein ran against each other in the 2012 U.S. presidential election, with both losing to incumbent Democratic President Barack Obama.

Romney performed strongly with Republicans and won many independents in the belt between Route 128 and I-495. He almost ran even with O'Brien in smaller working-class cities, and held down Democratic margins in large urban areas.  This was the fourth consecutive win for Republicans in the state gubernatorial contest.

Results by county

See also 
 Massachusetts general election, 2002
 Governorship of Mitt Romney
 2001–2002 Massachusetts legislature

References

External links 
 "Massachusetts 2002 Election Statewide Results" from Elections Division

Campaign sites
 
 

Gubernatorial
2002
Massachusetts
Mitt Romney